The Greek National Road 24 is a  paved road that connects Corfu with Paleokastritsa. It begins at the junction in front of the Platytera church and ends at Paleokastritsa's port. The road is a single carriageway with two lanes except the portion from Ethinkis Antistaseos junction to Dassia junction is a dual carriegway with two lanes. Points of interest along the route include the Paleokastritsa monastery, the Platytera church (where the body of Kapodistrias can be found), the Paleokastritsa beach, and the Aggelocastro Byzantine fortress.

Corfu (regional unit)
24
Roads in the Ionian Islands (region)